

Parties represented in the House of Assembly

Historical parties in the province of Newfoundland (since 1949)
 Labrador Party (1969–1975, 2003–2007)
 Newfoundland and Labrador First Party (1999–2011)
 Newfoundland Reform Liberal Party (1975)
 United Newfoundland Party (1932, 1959)
 Newfoundland Democratic Party (1959)

Historical parties during the Newfoundland National Convention (1947–1949)
 Responsible Government League (1947–1949)
 Confederate Association (1948–1949)
 Party for Economic Union with the United States (1948)

Historical parties in the Dominion of Newfoundland (1854–1936)
 Confederation Party (1860s)
 Anti-Confederation Party (1860s)
 Conservative Party of Newfoundland (various) (1854–1934 ) 
 Fisherman's Protective Union (1913–1934)
 Liberal Party of Newfoundland (various) (1854–1934)
 Liberal-Conservative-Progressive Party (1924–1932)
 Newfoundland People's Party (1907–1923)
 Tory Party (1890s)
 United Newfoundland Party (1932–1934)

See also
Elections Newfoundland & Labrador
List of Newfoundland and Labrador general elections
General elections in Newfoundland (pre-Confederation)

External links
Officially Registered Provincial Parties - Elections Newfoundland & Labrador

 
Newfoundland and Labrador
Parties

fr:Partis politiques canadiens#Terre-Neuve-et-Labrador